Perry Dozier Jr. (born October 25, 1996) is an American professional basketball player for the Sacramento Kings of the National Basketball Association (NBA). He played college basketball for the South Carolina Gamecocks.

College career
In his senior season at Spring Valley High School, he was named to the 2015 McDonald's All-American Boys Game roster and scored 14 points. He committed to South Carolina. ESPN ranked him the 21st best recruit in his class. His father, Perry Dozier, was a basketball player for South Carolina in the 1980s.

In his sophomore season, along with guard Sindarius Thornwell, Dozier was an important part of South Carolina's improbable Final Four appearance. He scored 21 points against Marquette in the NCAA Tournament. Dozier was named to the East Region All-Tournament Team. In the 77–73 loss to Gonzaga in the Final Four, Dozier had 17 points. At the conclusion of his sophomore season, Dozier announced his intention to forgo his final two seasons of collegiate eligibility and declare for the 2017 NBA Draft.

Professional career

Oklahoma City Thunder (2017–2018)
After going undrafted in 2017 NBA draft, Dozier signed with the Los Angeles Lakers for the 2017 NBA Summer League. He signed a contract with the Dallas Mavericks on August 8, 2017. He was released on October 14, 2017, before agreeing to a two-way contract with the Oklahoma City Thunder two days later. Under the terms of the deal, Dozier split time between the Thunder and their NBA G League affiliate, the Oklahoma City Blue. Dozier would make his NBA debut on February 8, 2018, in a loss to the Los Angeles Lakers.

Boston Celtics (2018–2019)
On August 21, 2018, Dozier signed a two-way contract with the Boston Celtics. In February 2019, Dozier was named to the All-NBA G League team, the equivalent of All-Star. On June 30, 2019, the Celtics declined to extend his contract, thus making him an unrestricted free agent.

On July 4, Dozier was included in the Philadelphia 76ers' Summer League team.

Denver Nuggets (2019–2022)
On August 13, 2019, Dozier signed a one-year contract with the Denver Nuggets. He was assigned to the Windy City Bulls for the start of the NBA G League season. On January 11, 2020, Dozier had a game-high 32 points, nine assists, eight rebounds, two steals and one block in a 120–112 win over the Fort Wayne Mad Ants. In his Denver debut on January 15, Dozier finished with 12 points as he filled in for the injured Jamal Murray. On June 30, the Denver Nuggets converted his two-way contract to a multi-year NBA contract.

On November 23, 2021, during a 100–119 loss to the Portland Trail Blazers, Dozier tore his left ACL. The next day, it was confirmed that the tear was a season-ending injury.

On January 19, 2022, Dozier was traded to the Boston Celtics in a three-team trade involving the San Antonio Spurs. On February 10, 2022, Dozier was traded to the Orlando Magic, without appearing in a game for the Celtics. He was waived by the Magic following the trade.

Iowa Wolves (2022–2023)
On September 17, 2022, Dozier signed with the Minnesota Timberwolves. On November 2, 2022, Dozier was named to the opening night roster for the Iowa Wolves.

Sacramento Kings (2023)
On January 9, 2023, the Sacramento Kings signed Dozier to a 10-day contract. On January 19, 2023, the Kings re-signed Dozier to a second 10-day contract. After his contract expired, the Kings opted not to re-sign him, instead signing Deonte Burton to a 10-day contract.

Return to Iowa (2023)
On January 29, 2023, Dozier was reacquired by the Iowa Wolves.

Return to Sacramento (2023–present)
On February 25, 2023, Dozier was reacquired by the Sacramento Kings.

Career statistics

NBA

Regular season

|-
| style="text-align:left;"| 
| style="text-align:left;"| Oklahoma City
| 2 || 0 || 1.5 || .500 ||  ||  || .5 || .0 || .0 || .0 || 1.0
|-
| style="text-align:left;"| 
| style="text-align:left;"| Boston
| 6 || 0 || 8.5 || .381 || .250 || .500 || 2.8 || .8 || .3 || .0 || 3.2
|-
| style="text-align:left;"| 
| style="text-align:left;"| Denver
| 29 || 0 || 14.2 || .414 || .347 || .724 || 1.9 || 2.2 || .5 || .2 || 5.8
|-
| style="text-align:left;"| 
| style="text-align:left;"| Denver
| 50 || 6 || 21.8 || .417 || .315 || .636 || 3.6 || 1.8 || .6 || .4 || 7.7
|-
| style="text-align:left;"| 
| style="text-align:left;"| Denver
| 18 || 0 || 18.9 || .364 || .313 || .769 || 3.5 || 1.6 || .6 || .3 || 5.4
|-
| style="text-align:left;"| 
| style="text-align:left;"| Sacramento
| 4 || 0 || 2.5 || .667 || .500 ||  || .5 || .0 || .8 || .0 || 1.3
|- class="sortbottom"
| style="text-align:center;" colspan="2"| Career
| 109 || 6 || 17.5 || .408 || .320 || .673 || 2.9 || 1.7 || .6 || .3 || 6.2

Playoffs

|-
| style="text-align:left;"| 2020
| style="text-align:left;"| Denver
| 12 || 0 || 10.4 || .424 || .250 || .571 || 1.5 || 1.0 || .2 || .2 || 3.2

College

|-
| style="text-align:left;"| 2015–16
| style="text-align:left;"| South Carolina
| 34 || 28 || 19.0 || .381 || .213 || .544 || 3.0 || 2.1 || 1.0 || .4 || 6.7
|-
| style="text-align:left;"| 2016–17
| style="text-align:left;"| South Carolina
| 36 || 36 || 28.7 || .407 || .298 || .597 || 4.8 || 2.8 || 1.7 || .3 || 13.9
|- class="sortbottom"
| style="text-align:center;" colspan="2"| Career
| 70 || 64 || 24.0 || .398 || .277 || .579 || 3.9 || 2.4 || 1.3 || .3 || 10.4

Personal life
Dozier is a second cousin of the late Reggie Lewis, a former Celtics player who died as a result of heart failure. While a member of the Oklahoma City Thunder, Dozier wore the jersey number #35 as a tribute to Lewis. Dozier's uncle, Terry Dozier, played for the Charlotte Hornets of the NBA.

Dozier's father, Perry, and his uncle, Terry, played basketball at South Carolina. Perry Sr and Terry are twins.  His older sister Asia also played basketball at South Carolina.

References

External links

1996 births
Living people
American men's basketball players
Basketball players from Columbia, South Carolina
Boston Celtics players
Denver Nuggets players
Iowa Wolves players
Maine Red Claws players
McDonald's High School All-Americans
Oklahoma City Blue players
Oklahoma City Thunder players
Point guards
Sacramento Kings players
Shooting guards
Small forwards
South Carolina Gamecocks men's basketball players
Undrafted National Basketball Association players
Windy City Bulls players